{{Automatic taxobox
|name = Pultenaea sp. Genowlan Point
|status = CR
|status_system = EPBC
|status_ref = 
|taxon = Pultenaea
|species_text = P. sp. Genowlan Point
|binomial_text = Pultenaea sp. Genowlan Point
|authority = 
}}Pultenaea'' sp. Genowlan Point''' is a critically endangered undescribed species of flowering plant in the family Fabaceae–Faboideae. It is only known from one population at Genowlan Point in the Capertee Valley within the Rylstone local government area of New South Wales.

References

Genowlan Point
Flora of New South Wales
Undescribed plant species